The Tramplers is a 1965 Italian Spaghetti Western film directed by Albert Band and Mario Sequi based on the novel Guns of North Texas by Will Cook.

Story
When Lon Cordeen, an ex-Civil War soldier, returns home to his father Temple he finds his father can't accept the loss of the Confederacy. When Temple tries to help the South rise again serious conflicts develop which split the family.

Cast
Gordon Scott as Lon Cordeen
Joseph Cotten as Temple Cordeen
Muriel Franklin as Alice Cordeen
James Mitchum as Hoby Cordeen
Ilaria Occhini as Edith Wickett
Frank Nero as Charley Garvey
Emil Jordan as Fred Wickett
Franco Balducci as Pete Wiley
Silla Bettini as Hogan
Caroll Brown as Mrs. Temple Cordeen
Aldo Cecconi as Jim Hennessy
Georges Lycan as Longfellow Wiley
Dario Michaelis as Bert Cordeen
Edith Peters as Emma
Romano Puppo as Payne Cordeen
Ivan Scratuglia as Adrian Cordeen
Emma Valloni as Bess Cordeen
Ken Wlaschin as Saloon owner
Lino Desmond as sheriff
Giovanni Cianfriglia

Releases
This was released on a limited edition R0 NTSC DVD by Wild East Productions in 2013.

External links
 

1965 films
1960s Italian-language films
English-language Italian films
1960s English-language films
Italian Western (genre) films
Spaghetti Western films
1965 Western (genre) films
Films based on American novels
Films based on Western (genre) novels
Films directed by Albert Band
Films scored by Angelo Francesco Lavagnino
Films directed by Mario Sequi
1960s multilingual films
Italian multilingual films
1960s Italian films